Robert Donald Blue (September 24, 1898 – December 14, 1989) was the 30th Governor of Iowa from 1945 to 1949.

Biography
Blue attended Capital City Commercial College and Iowa State University.  He served in the United States Army during World War I.  After the war, he earned a law degree from Drake University Law School in 1922.  He practiced law in Eagle Grove and was County Attorney of Wright County, Iowa from 1924 to 1931 and City Attorney of Eagle Grove from 1932 to 1934.

In 1934, Blue was elected to the Iowa House of Representatives.  He was reelected in 1936, 1938, 1940, and 1942, and was Speaker of the Iowa House from 1939 to 1943.  He was elected the Lieutenant Governor of Iowa in 1942 and then Governor in 1944, winning reelection in 1946.

Blue's policies were unpopular among labor groups (opposed to his bill outlawing the closed shop), farmers (opposed to his tax policies), and teachers (opposed to his cuts in education funding).  One of his principal opponents in the legislature, William S. Beardsley, took advantage of Blue's unpopularity and successfully challenged him in the Republican primary in 1948.  Blue left public life and returned to his hometown of Eagle Grove.  He died of a stroke in Fort Dodge, Iowa on December 14, 1989.

Legacy 

Before his death, the middle school in Eagle Grove, Iowa changed its name to Robert Blue Middle School (RBMS). Mr. Blue was in attendance at the ceremony.

References 

  National Governors Association biography
 "Popularity in Reverse", TIME, June 21, 1948
 "Robert D. Blue Dies, Former Iowa Governor", The New York Times, December 18, 1989
 The Robert Donald Blue Papers are housed at the University of Iowa Special Collections & University Archives.

1898 births
1989 deaths
Lieutenant Governors of Iowa
Republican Party governors of Iowa
United States Army personnel of World War I
Iowa State University alumni
Iowa lawyers
Speakers of the Iowa House of Representatives
Republican Party members of the Iowa House of Representatives
People from Eagle Grove, Iowa
20th-century American politicians
20th-century American lawyers
Drake University Law School alumni